The Ping Yuen River (also known as River Ganges) (Hong Kong Chinese: Ap5li4 Ziu1; Hong Kong Chinese: Pin2ngien2 Ho2) is a river in the northern New Territories, Hong Kong. Its source lies near Cheung Shan in Ping Che. It flows along Ping Che Road and into the River Ganges Pumping Station near Chau Tin Village before emptying into the Sham Chun River.

See also
List of rivers and nullahs in Hong Kong

References
2007. 2007 Hong Kong Map. Easy Finder Ltd.

External links
Rivers of Hong Kong, in Chinese

Rivers of Hong Kong
North District, Hong Kong